...Sounds Like This is the third album from English progressive rock band Nektar, released in 1973. It was the first Nektar album to be released in their home country of the United Kingdom. An attempt to recreate the band's live sound, ...Sounds Like This was largely improvised and dominated by extensive instrumental jamming, in contrast to their usual concept and composition-driven albums. The different approach to recording, combined with a number of difficulties with the mixing, resulted in it being the band's heaviest work.

Background and recording
The idea behind ...Sounds Like This, conceived by the band themselves, was to create an album that recreated Nektar's live sound while avoiding the various recording and sound quality difficulties inherent to live recordings. To this end, on 12 October 1972 the band set up their gear in Dierks Studios and performed for a little over an hour to an audience of just a small group of friends. The majority of the tracks had already been written before Nektar had formed, and were commonly played during their live shows before the album's recording. Some had also been recorded in 1970 as the, "Boston Tapes," but those recordings were never released until their inclusion on the 40th Anniversary Edition of Remember the Future .

Dissatisfied with the original master, Nektar and producer Peter Hauke opted to do a series of dubs and re-recordings, which took place in February. Of the tracks recorded during the original October session, only "Wings" appeared on the album in its original form, without dubbing or additional takes. Two songs from the original session ("Sunshine Down on the City" and "It's All in Ya Mind") were cut from the album entirely, and new songs that had been written in the intervening four months were added. The original sleeve notes state the album to have been recorded entirely in February 1973, omitting the October 1972 session. Several of the recordings from the October 1972 session later appeared as bonus tracks.

Reception

Allmusic's brief retrospective review dismissed ...Sounds Like This as "a step backward, with lighter, less ambitious songs that didn't work as well as their long form sound."

Track listing

2006 reissue

2013 reissue
Double CD reissue on Purple Pyramid Records.  Disc one is the original double LP.  Disc two includes bonus tracks: two radio edits, plus more songs from the same "Official Bootleg" 1971 live show used for bonus tracks on the 2013 reissues of  Journey to the Centre of the Eye and A Tab in the Ocean.  The 2013 reissue includes none of the bonus tracks from the 2006 reissue.

Personnel
Roye Albrighton – lead vocals, guitars
Allan "Taff" Freeman – keyboards, vocals
Derek "Mo" Moore – bass, vocals
Ron Howden – drums, percussion
Mick Brockett – lights

Production
Peter Hauke – producer
Dieter Dierks – engineer

References

External links
 Sounds Like This at TheNektarProject.com

Nektar albums
1973 albums
Bacillus Records albums